These are tables of space probes (typically orbiters or components thereof) which have been deliberately destroyed at their objects of study, typically by hard landings or crash landings at the end of their respective missions and/or functionality. This endeavor not only precludes the hazards of orbital space debris and planetary contamination, but also provides the opportunity in some cases for terminal science given that the transient light released by the kinetic energy may be available for spectroscopy; the physical ejecta remains in place for further study.  Even after soft landings had been mastered, NASA used crash landings to test whether Moon craters contained ice by crashing space probes into craters and testing the debris that got thrown out.  

Several rocket stages utilized during the Apollo space program were deliberately crashed on the Moon to aid seismic research, and four of the ascent stages of Apollo Lunar Modules were deliberately crashed onto the Moon after they had fulfilled their primary mission. In total at least NASA 47 rocket bodies have impacted the Moon.

The most recent impactor, the unusual double-crater of which was photographed on March 4, 2022 by the Lunar Reconnaissance Orbiter, is of unknown provenance; no space program has taken credit for it.   
The Deep Impact mission had its own purpose-built impactor which hit Comet 9P/Tempel 1. Terminal approaches to gas giants which resulted in the destruction of the space probe count as crash landings for the purposes of this article.
The crash landing sites themselves are of interest to space archeology.

Luna 1, not itself a lunar orbiter, was the first spacecraft designed as an impactor. It failed to hit the Moon in 1959, however, thus inadvertently becoming the first man-made object to leave geocentric orbit and enter a heliocentric orbit, where it remains to this day.

Mercury

Moon

Mars

Comets

Asteroids

Jupiter

Saturn

Venus and others

Venus
Pioneer Venus Orbiter (atmospheric disintegration)
Pioneer Venus Multiprobe (atmospheric entry probe)
Magellan (atmospheric disintegration)
Venus Express (atmospheric disintegration)
433 Eros
NEAR Shoemaker

Chronological Gallery

See also
List of extraterrestrial orbiters
List of landings on extraterrestrial bodies
Flyby (spaceflight)
Space rendezvous

References

Spaceflight timelines

Space probes